The 1983–84 NBA season was the 76ers' 35th season in the NBA and 21st season in Philadelphia. The 76ers entered the season as the defending NBA Champions, having won their third NBA Championship the year prior, sweeping the Los Angeles Lakers in four games. The team would start fast posting 21 wins in their first 26 games but finished with a 52-30 record. The major difference was that they were just around .500 on the road for the year, unlike the previous season, where they won 30 regular season games away from Philadelphia. The 76ers would lose in the first round of the newly expanded playoff format to the New Jersey Nets, who had never won a playoff series in their NBA history to that point. The 76ers lost all three post season games at The Spectrum.

Draft picks

Roster

Regular season

Season standings

z – clinched division title
y – clinched division title
x – clinched playoff spot

Record vs. opponents

Game log

Regular season

Playoffs

|- align="center" bgcolor="#ffcccc"
| 1
| April 18
| New Jersey
| L 101–116
| Andrew Toney (24)
| Moses Malone (11)
| Julius Erving (8)
| Spectrum12,511
| 0–1
|- align="center" bgcolor="#ffcccc"
| 2
| April 20
| New Jersey
| L 102–116
| Moses Malone (25)
| Moses Malone (12)
| Toney, Richardson (4)
| Spectrum14,025
| 0–2
|- align="center" bgcolor="#ccffcc"
| 3
| April 22
| @ New Jersey
| W 108–100
| Julius Erving (27)
| Moses Malone (17)
| Erving, Cheeks (5)
| Brendan Byrne Arena12,399
| 1–2
|- align="center" bgcolor="#ccffcc"
| 4
| April 24
| @ New Jersey
| W 110–102
| Malone, Erving (22)
| Moses Malone (15)
| Julius Erving (8)
| Brendan Byrne Arena20,149
| 2–2
|- align="center" bgcolor="#ffcccc"
| 5
| April 26
| New Jersey
| L 98–101
| Andrew Toney (22)
| Moses Malone (14)
| Maurice Cheeks (7)
| Spectrum17,921
| 2–3
|-

Player statistics

Playoffs

Awards and records
 Julius Erving, All-NBA Second Team
 Moses Malone, All-NBA Second Team
 Bobby Jones, NBA All-Defensive First Team
 Maurice Cheeks, NBA All-Defensive First Team

References

See also
 1983–84 NBA season

Philadelphia 76ers seasons
Ph
Philadelphia
Philadelphia